Sette contro tutti or Seven Rebel Gladiators is a 1965 Italian film directed by Michele Lupo.

Plot

Cast
Roger Browne as Marcus Aulus (as Roger Brown)
José Greci as Assuer (as Liz Havilland)
Alfio Caltabiano as Vadius (as Al Northon)
Harold Bradley	as Tucos
Mario Novelli	as Physios (as Anthony Freeman)
Erno Crisa	as Morakeb
Carlo Tamberlani as King Krontal (as Bud Stevenson)
Arnaldo Fabrizio as Goliath (as Little Goliath)
Pietro Tordi (as Peter Barclay)

External links
 

1965 films
1960s Italian-language films
Peplum films
Films directed by Michele Lupo
Films about gladiatorial combat
Films scored by Francesco De Masi
Sword and sandal films
1960s Italian films